Rangpur Polytechnic Institute is a technical educational institution in Rangpur, Bangladesh. It was established in 1882. It provides four year Diploma in Engineering Degree. Student who passed secondary school can enroll for studying Diploma in Engineering. After successfully completing four year Diploma in Engineering Degree student can apply for jobs where they will work as a Sub-Assistant Engineer. Rangpur Polytechnic Institute is one of the most popular and largest polytechnic institute in Bangladesh.

History 
Since 1882 the British during the "District Council building", which is closer to the place, "Bailey Govinda Technical School" with the name of the institute is working. An expert on the technical education institutions have the manpower to make.

Now the campus of the name "Technical School and College in Rangpur, Rangpur." India and Pakistan were divided in 1962. The citizen and the Institute of Energy Technologies and its name "Rangpur Technical Institute" has been converted into.

Departments and subjects 
Rangpur Polytechnic Institute is offering Diploma in Engineering certification under 07 departments- 
 Civil Technology
 Computer Technology
 Electrical Technology
 Electro -medical Technology
 Electronics Technology
 Mechanical Technology
 Power Technology

Course and grading system 
Diploma in Engineering certification is divided into eight semesters. Each semester have a specific course credit, and is evaluating under scale of 4.00. An Industrial Training is conducting at the last semester.

Campus 

The campus of Rangpur Polytechnic Institute contains Academic buildings, Library, Workshop, Lab, Hostel, Playground, Lake and other facilities.

Student organizations 

 Rover Scout Group
 Sports Association
 Students Parliament

See also 

 Bogra Polytechnic Institute
 Chandpur Polytechnic Institute
 Chittagong Polytechnic Institute
 Dinajpur Polytechnic Institute
 Dhaka Polytechnic Institute
 Faridpur Polytechnic Institute
 Feni Polytechnic Institute
 Jessore Polytechnic Institute
 Khulna Polytechnic Institute

References 

1968 establishments in East Pakistan
Polytechnic institutes in Bangladesh
Educational institutions established in 1968